This is a list of the series that have run in the Shueisha manga anthology book for boys, Jump Square.  This list, organized by decade and year of when the series started, will list every single notable series run in the manga magazine, the author of the series and, in case the series has ended, when it has ended.

2000s

2007–2009

2010s

2010–2014

2015–2019

2020s

2020–present

Online manga series

Jump SQ.19 manga series

Jump SQ.Crown manga series

Jump SQ.Rise manga series

Super Dash Manga Program Series
 shortened to SDMP, is the supplement manga magazine of Jump Square. It is published from April 21 to October 4 of 2011. Super Dash Manga Program focuses on series and one shots of the comicalization on light novels from Super Dash Bunko.

Light novels
 light novels were serialized near the end of Jump SQ and in Super Dash Manga Program.

References

Manga magazines published in Japan
Lists of manga series